The Malá Strana Bridge Tower is located in Prague, Czech Republic. The tower serves as the entrance to Malá Strana from the Charles Bridge.

See also

 Old Town Bridge Tower

External links
 

Towers in Prague
Malá Strana